Playtime Is Over or Playtime's Over may refer to:

 Playtime's Over (album), by Candyman, 1991
 Playtime Is Over (Wiley album), 2007
 Playtime Is Over (mixtape), by Nicki Minaj, 2007
 Playtyme Is Over, an album by Immature, 1994
 "Playtime's Over" (Teenage Mutant Ninja Turtles), a 2006 television episode

See also
 Playtime (disambiguation)